Lycée Saint-Exupéry or Lycée Antoine-de-Saint-Exupéry may refer to:
In France:
 Cité scolaire Antoine de Saint-Exupéry in Lyon (Rhône (department))
 Lycée Saint-Exupéry (Marseilles)
  in La Rochelle
 Lycée Saint-Exupéry (Blagnac)
 Lycée Saint-Exupéry (Créteil)
 Lycée Saint-Exupéry (Mantes-la-Jolie)

Outside France:
 Lycée Antoine-de-Saint-Exupéry de Hambourg in Hamburg, Germany
 Lycée Antoine-de-Saint-Exupéry de Santiago in Santiago de Chile
 Lycée Saint-Exupéry de Ouagadougou in Ouagadougou, Burkina Faso
 Lycée Français Saint-Exupery de Brazzaville